This is a list of the most-played mobile games ordered by their player count, which include reported player data, registered accounts, and/or monthly active users. For non-mobile games, see the list of most-played video games by player count. Mobile games are defined as games that have only been released on mobile operating systems, particularly Android and iOS.

List

See also 
 List of most-played video games by player count
 List of highest-grossing mobile games
 List of best-selling video games
 List of best-selling video game franchises

Notes

References 

Lists of video games
Games, mobile